Frost Giant is the second studio album from The Dead Science, released in 2005 on Absolutely Kosher Records. It was recorded at Bear Creek Studio over ten days in December 2004. Korum Bischoff drummed on some tracks, Nick Tamburro on others.

Track listing
 "Last Return"  – 2:48
 "In the Hospital"  – 3:45
 "Drrrty Magneto"  – 4:06
 "Sam Mickens' Dreams"  – 4:13
 "The Future, Forever (Until You Die)"  – 3:52
 "Blood Tuning"  – 5:10
 "Black Stockings"  – 4:20
 "Lil' Half Dead"  – 6:12
 "Lead to Gold in the Hour of Chaos"  – 3:03

References

External links
 MP3 of "Drrrty Magneto" (from record label site)
 An interview on the recording of the album
 Absolute Kosher (record label)  
 (May 19, 2006) "Dark Oak." Retrieved Sep. 23, 2006. News item regarding LP version of Frost Giant from Marriage Records.

2005 albums
The Dead Science albums
Absolutely Kosher Records albums
Albums recorded at Bear Creek Studio
Norse mythology in music